Joseph Shimmon (July 4, 1894 – February 9, 1992) was an American wrestler. He competed in the freestyle lightweight event at the 1920 Summer Olympics, where he reached the quarterfinals.

References

External links
 

1894 births
1992 deaths
Olympic wrestlers of the United States
Wrestlers at the 1920 Summer Olympics
American male sport wrestlers
People from Urmia
American expatriates in Iran